Magdallan (later known as Magdalen), was an American Christian metal supergroup, originally started in 1990, as a studio project and collaboration between Ken Tamplin and Lanny Cordola. The band was active from 1990 to 1995, released 2 albums and an EP, and was signed to Intense Records and Essential Records respectively.

History
The band's original lineup was Ken Tamplin, Lanny Cordola, Brian Bromberg, and Ken Mary.  After the first album Ken Tamplin departed and Phillip Bardowell took over vocal duties. Chuck Wright would later replace Bromberg for the Magdalen releases. 

Magdallan's lineup led to the group being referred to as a supergroup.  Ken Tamplin was well known for his work in Shout.  Lanny Cordola, Chuck Wright, Ken Mary were previously well known for being members of the group House of Lords.

Big Bang
The band's first release, Big Bang, was notable as one of the most expensive Christian albums produced by that time, with a budget reported as being $250,000, and the album faced some criticism for being overproduced.  Nevertheless, Big Bang was nominated for one GMA Dove Award for Best Metal/Hard Rock Album in 1992, but did not win.

Ken Tamplin's departure
After the first album was released, Tamplin left the band. Tamplin commented that he felt the need for a fresh start after he learned that Intense Records had planned to shelve the Big Bang album after two years of hard work. After Tamplin's departure, the studio project of Magdallan was turned into a full band and thus the name was changed from Magdallan to Magdalen.

Name change
After Ken Tamplin left the band, the name was changed to Magdalen for the second release Revolution Mind and The Dirt EP.  In 1999  a compilation album, End of the Age was released under the old name spelling.  The significance of the name change is signification of the difference between the studio project and the band.  Magdallan is the name of the studio project, and Magdalen is the name of the band that continued after Ken Tamplin's departure.

Discography

As Magdallan
Big Bang (1992) Intense Records
End of the Age (Compilation; 1999) KMG Records

Revolution Mind (1993) Essential Records
The Dirt (1995) Intense Records

References

American Christian metal musical groups
Heavy metal supergroups
American glam metal musical groups
Musical groups established in 1990
Musical groups disestablished in 1995